Elections to the Rajasthan Legislative Assembly were held in May 1985, to elect members of the 200 constituencies in Rajasthan, India. The Indian National Congress won a majority of seats as well as the popular vote, and its leader, Hari Dev Joshi was appointed as the Chief Minister of Rajasthan.

After the passing of The Delimitation of Parliamentary and Assembly Constituencies Order, 1976, Rajasthan's Legslative Assembly was assigned 200 constituencies.

Result

Elected Members

See also 
 List of constituencies of the Rajasthan Legislative Assembly

References

Rajasthan
1985
1985